Group 1 of the UEFA Euro 1972 qualifying tournament was one of the eight groups to decide which teams would qualify for the UEFA Euro 1972 finals tournament. Group 1 consisted of four teams: Romania, Czechoslovakia, Wales, and Finland, where they played against each other home-and-away in a round-robin format. The group winners were Romania, who finished above Czechoslovakia on goal difference.

Final table

Matches

Goalscorers

References
 
 
 

Group 1
1970–71 in Romanian football
1971–72 in Romanian football
1970–71 in Czechoslovak football
1971–72 in Czechoslovak football
1970–71 in Welsh football
1971–72 in Welsh football
1970 in Finnish football
1971 in Finnish football